Committee on the Militia may refer to:

United States House Committee on the Militia
United States Senate Committee on the Militia